Hôtel de la plage is a French-language television series. It has been distributed from 2014 to 2015 on France 2 (France). The network decided to end the show after season 2.

Plot 
At Ronce-les-Bains, a resort in the southwest of France, five families meet every year at the Hôtel de la plage (beach hotel) for a long-awaited summer break, away from everyday life. But nothing goes as planned.

Cast
 Bruno Solo : Paul Lopez
 Jonathan Zaccaï :  Martin Guignard
 Yvon Back : Victor
 Annick Blancheteau : Yvonne
 Sophie-Charlotte Husson : Isabelle
 Fatima Adoum : Samia Lopez
 Arnaud Henriet : Yann
 Olivia Côte : Marine
 Karina Testa : Sophie
 Pascal Elso: Jeff
 Philippe Hérisson : Jeff
 Xavier Robic : Benjamin
 Nassim Si Ahmed : Omar
 Farida Ouchani : Aïcha
 Méliane Marcaggi : Morgane
 Margaux Rossi : Fanny
 Gaïa Berthomme : Elsa
 Adam Neil : Kevin
 Manon Giraud-Balasuriya : Manon
 Gilles Mercier : Tom
 Valérie Dashwood : Stéphanie
 Alexandre Tacchino : Julien
 Olivia Gallay : Nina
 Joël Pyrene : Roger
 Elie Tertois : Ludo
 Juliet Lemonnier : Carla
 Mireille Perrier : Rose

Guest
 Luce : Herself (Episode 2, Season 2)
 Françoise Lépine : Océane (Episode 6, Season 2)

References

External links
 

2014 French television series debuts
France 2
France Télévisions original programming